Jan-Michael Gambill was the defending champion but lost in the semifinals to Davide Sanguinetti.

Sanguinetti won in the final 6–4, 4–6, 6–4 against Andy Roddick.

Seeds

  Andy Roddick (final)
  Jan-Michael Gambill (semifinals)
  Stefan Koubek (first round)
  Nicolás Massú (second round, retired because of a right elbow injury)
  Davide Sanguinetti (champion)
  Lars Burgsmüller (second round)
  Jarkko Nieminen (second round)
  Markus Hipfl (second round)

Draw

Finals

Top half

Bottom half

External links
 2002 Delray Beach International Tennis Championships draw

2002
2002 ATP Tour
2002 Delray Beach International Tennis Championships